Fockenbach is a river of Rhineland-Palatinate, Germany.

The Fockenbach springs east of Straßenhaus and southeast of Niederhonnefeld (a district of Straßenhaus). It discharges at Niederbreitbach into the Wied.

See also
List of rivers of Rhineland-Palatinate

References

External links
Description of the Fockenbach valley (in German)

Rivers of Rhineland-Palatinate
Rivers of Germany